Bottner or Böttner is a German surname. Notable people with the surname include:

Andrea Bottner (born 1971), American lawyer and diplomat
Barbara Bottner, American author and artist
Johannes Böttner (1861–1919), German horticulturist
Lorenza Böttner (1959–1994), German-Chilean multidisciplinary artist